The canton of Laragne-Montéglin is an administrative division in southeastern France. At the French canton reorganisation which came into effect in March 2015, the canton was expanded from 7 to 13 communes (3 of which merged into the new commune Val Buëch-Méouge):
 
Barret-sur-Méouge
Éourres
Laragne-Montéglin
Lazer
Monêtier-Allemont
Le Poët
Saint-Pierre-Avez
Salérans
Upaix
Val Buëch-Méouge
Ventavon

Demographics

See also
Cantons of the Hautes-Alpes department
Communes of France

References

Cantons of Hautes-Alpes